Jiang Wenwen  (born 23 November 1986 in Longkou, Shandong) is a Chinese track cyclist.  At the 2012 Summer Olympics, she competed in the Women's team pursuit for the national team.

Major results
  2011-2012 Track Cycling World Cup in Astana - Team pursuit
2014
1st  Team Pursuit, 2014 Asian Track Championships (with Huang Dongyan, Jing Yali and Zhao Baofang)
1st  Team Pursuit, Asian Games (with Huang Dongyan, Jing Yali and Zhao Baofang)
2015
1st  Team Pursuit, Asian Track Championships (with Huang Dongyan, Jing Yali and Zhao Baofang)

References

Chinese female cyclists
Living people
Olympic cyclists of China
Cyclists at the 2012 Summer Olympics
Chinese track cyclists
Asian Games medalists in cycling
Cyclists at the 2014 Asian Games
Asian Games gold medalists for China
Medalists at the 2014 Asian Games
1986 births
Cyclists from Shandong
Sportspeople from Yantai
21st-century Chinese women